David J. Furness is a United States Marine Corps lieutenant general who has served as the Deputy Commandant for Plans, Policies, and Operations since August 2021. He previously was the Assistant Deputy Commandant for Plans, Policies and Operations from August 2020 to August 2021.

References

Living people
Place of birth missing (living people)
Recipients of the Defense Superior Service Medal
Recipients of the Legion of Merit
United States Marine Corps generals
United States Marine Corps personnel of the Gulf War
United States Marine Corps personnel of the Iraq War
United States Marine Corps personnel of the War in Afghanistan (2001–2021)
Year of birth missing (living people)